CDPPB is a drug used in scientific research which acts as a positive allosteric modulator selective for the metabotropic glutamate receptor subtype mGluR5. It has antipsychotic effects in animal models, and mGluR5 modulators are under investigation as potential drugs for the treatment of schizophrenia, as well as other applications.

References

Pyrazoles
Benzamides
Nitriles
MGlu5 receptor agonists